Haynes Glacier is a broad glacier flowing to the Walgreen Coast of Marie Byrd Land, Antarctica, to the east of Mount Murphy. It was mapped by the United States Geological Survey from surveys and U.S. Navy air photos, 1959–66, and was named by the Advisory Committee on Antarctic Names after Major John W. Haynes, United States Marine Corps, an aircraft pilot on Operation Deep Freeze 1967 and 1968, who made a photographic flight over this glacier on January 1, 1967.

References

Glaciers of Marie Byrd Land